= Vivian Mokome =

South African entrepreneur and philanthropist

Vivian Mokome is a South African entrepreneur and philanthropist. She is the founder of Dignity Organic Sanitaries, a menstrual hygiene products company, and the Mokome Foundation, a non-profit organisation involved in community initiatives. She previously worked in the banking and ICT sectors before entering entrepreneurship.

== Early life and education ==
Mokome was born in Limpopo Province, South Africa, and grew up on the outskirts of Gauteng Province. She enrolled at the University of the Witwatersrand (Wits), where she studied information systems and business applications. She obtained a masters degree from the university in 2014 and subsequently pursued doctoral studies in information systems, completing her PhD in 2025.

== Career ==
Mokome began her professional career in the ICT and banking sectors, working as a business analyst and IT portfolio manager. Her responsibilities included the development and implementation of information systems and business processes within the banking industry. In 2013, she presented research on information technology project management at an international conference in Spain. The research examined factors affecting the implementation of IT projects in South African organisations. During the same year, she received an executive committee award at First National Bank for her work on the implementation of business processes relating to card and cheque sales.

In 2017, Mokome entered the network marketing industry, initially seeking an additional source of income. She subsequently developed a business network through direct selling and expanded her entrepreneurial activities. In 2018, she resigned from her corporate position to focus on entrepreneurship. Her business interests included network marketing, property investment and agricultural ventures. In 2021, media reports described Mokome as one of South Africa's young self-made millionaires. She was also reported to have developed a network of distributors across several African countries and internationally.

In 2022, she was invited to represent South Africa at a network marketing convention in Dallas, Texas, United States, where she shared her experiences in the industry. Then 2023, Mokome began developing an organic sanitary pad business after identifying concerns about menstrual hygiene products and access to sanitary products among schoolgirls and women in disadvantaged communities. She subsequently partnered with businessman George Sebulela to develop the Dignity Organic Sanitaries brand.

The business initially imported organic sanitary products and distributed them through community initiatives while pursuing local production and distribution. In September 2023, media reports stated that the company had obtained a license to manufacture and distribute the products to local retail outlets in South Africa.

In May 2024, Dignity Organic Sanitary Pads was formally promoted as a business initiative focused on menstrual hygiene, product accessibility and economic opportunities. The business received further media coverage in August and September 2024 for its approach to menstrual health and the distribution of sanitary products to women and girls.

Mokome has also advocated greater public and corporate participation in addressing period poverty and improving access to menstrual hygiene products.

== Philanthropy ==
Mokome co-founded the Mokome Foundation with her husband. The foundation focuses on supporting disadvantaged communities, particularly through initiatives relating to education and menstrual hygiene.> The foundation has supported schools in Limpopo and Gauteng provinces through donations of sanitary pads to schoolgirls. In 2021, media reports indicated that the foundation had adopted more than eight schools and distributed sanitary products to learners.
